Arctiarpia mossi is a moth of the subfamily Arctiinae first described by Walter Rothschild in 1922. It is found in Guyana, French Guiana, Peru and Amazonas.

Subspecies
Arctiarpia mossi mossi
Arctiarpia mossi fluviatalis (Rothschild, 1922)
Arctiarpia mossi melanopasta Dognin, 1907 (French Guiana)

References

Phaegopterina
Moths of South America